American recording artist Kevin Gates has released three studio albums, three extended plays, seventeen mixtapes and thirty-four singles (including ten as a featured artist).

Albums

Studio albums

Mixtapes

Extended plays

Singles

As lead artist

As featured artist

Other charted and certified songs

Other guest appearances

Notes

References

Discographies of American artists
Hip hop discographies